WinkBall is an Internet video company established in 2009 by Duncan Barclay and James Ohene-Djan. It has staff of 60 full-time employees, 300 reporters in the UK, US, India and South Africa. It has an active user group of 150,000. Video reporters interview people at events and upload the videos online for social media sharing. WinkBall has achieved technical advances in video content creation and multi-user, large-scale access. Since 2009, three million videos have been uploaded to WinkBall, attracting over 30 million views.

WinkBall provides video content for hundreds of organisations.

Notable work 
It runs campaigns such as, "Faces for the Forces," which enabled the public to send a million video messages of support to British Armed Forces serving abroad. Brigadier AT Davies MBE at HQ Joint Forces sent a letter of thanks to WinkBall. The campaign was endorsed by David Cameron, Gordon Brown and Nick Clegg.

500 potential Parliamentary candidates recorded one minute videos explaining why people should vote for them in a campaign called "Do You Know Who You're Voting For?" during the runup to the 2010 election.

In collaboration with the United Nations and The Hoping Foundation charity, WinkBall helped commemorate the 20th anniversary of the International Year of the Child and the 60th anniversary of the creation of the United Nations Relief and Works Agency (UNRWA) by using video technology to connect 500 United Nations schools in Palestine, Syria, Jordan and Lebanon. This inspired 50,000 schoolchildren to record video messages expressing their hopes and dreams for the future in an online video yearbook.

References

Internet properties established in 2009